Daniel Mongrain (also known as Dan Mongrain and Chewy) is perhaps best known as a co-founder of the Quebec technical death metal band Martyr. He composes, sings and plays lead and rhythm guitar. Mongrain is currently a guitarist and composes as a member for the Canadian thrash/progressive metal band Voivod since 2008, replacing late guitarist Denis D'Amour.

Mongrain was a session and touring guitarist for the Canadian metal bands Cryptopsy (2005), Gorguts (2000), Alcoholica (2004) and Capharnaum (2003).

In addition to the metal genre, Mongrain plays guitar with several Quebec artists including Dan Bigras, Breen Leboeuf, Bruno Pelletier for the musical Dracula - Entre l'amour et la mort among others and played with more than 80 different formations, bands in numerous genres from Blues to rock to hip-hop to prog to metal, etc. His latest cover band project is a tribute band to progressive music from the 1970s called Jurassik Rock.

Mongrain has a bachelor's degree in Jazz Interpretation at University of Montreal and teaches jazz and pop guitar and theory courses at the Cégep régional de Lanaudière, Joliette Campus.

Mongrain is vegetarian.

In 2020, Mongrain contributed guitar to Big Scenic Nowhere's Lavender Blues EP.

Equipment

Guitars 
Bond instruments guitars

Amps 

Marshall JCM-800
Mesa/Boogie Dual Rectifier/Mark V

Discography

With Martyr 
Ostrogoth (1995) (Independent)
Hopeless Hopes (1997) Re-release (Galy Records)
Warp Zone (2000) (Warfare Records)
Extracting the Core (2001) (Galy Records)
Feeding the Abscess (2006) (Galy Records)
Havoc in Quebec City DVD (2008) (Galy Records)

With Gorguts 
From Wisdom to Hate (2001)

With Capharnaum 
Fractured (2004)

With Voivod 
Tatsumaki (Live in Japan DVD) (2009)
Warriors of Ice (Live in Mtl) (2011)
Target Earth (2013)
Post Society (2016)
The Wake (2018)
Synchro Anarchy (2022)

References

External links
 Daniel Mongrain information on Martyr website
 Voivod

1976 births
Living people
Canadian heavy metal guitarists
Canadian male guitarists
Canadian singer-songwriters
Singers from Quebec
Musicians from Trois-Rivières
Progressive metal guitarists
Capharnaum (band) members
Voivod (band) members
Gorguts members
21st-century Canadian guitarists
21st-century Canadian male singers
Canadian male singer-songwriters